Kniveton is an unincorporated community in Cherokee and Crawford counties of Kansas in the United States.

History
A post office was established in Kniveton in 1895, and remained in operation until it was discontinued in 1902.

References

Further reading

External links
 Cherokee County maps: Current, Historic, KDOT
 Crawford County maps: Current, Historic, KDOT

Unincorporated communities in Cherokee County, Kansas
Unincorporated communities in Crawford County, Kansas
Unincorporated communities in Kansas